The 2021–22 DEL2 season was the ninth season since the founding of the DEL2, the second tier of German ice hockey, set below the Deutsche Eishockey Liga (DEL).

Teams

14 teams took part in the league. The Selber Wölfe were promoted from the big Oberliga. 2021-2022 DEL2 Champions Bietigheim Steelers had been promoted to the DEL.

Regular season

Playoffs

Championship

Relegation

References

External links

 Official website
 Official Facebook
 Elite Prospects home

2021-22 DEL2
Germany
2021–22 in German ice hockey